The Peruvian cabinet of Rosario Fernández under the presidency of Alan García was in office from 19 March to 28 July 2011.

Government ministries of Peru